A list of films produced in the Cinema of Austria in the 1970s ordered by year of release. For an alphabetical list of articles on Austrian films see :Category:Austrian films.

External links
 Austrian film at the Internet Movie Database
http://www.austrianfilm.com/

1970s
Austrian
Films